Simarro is a surname. Notable people with the surname include:

 Juan Antonio Simarro (born 1973), Spanish composer, interpreter, and producer
 Luis Simarro Lacabra (1851–1921), Spanish neurologist

See also
 Simaro

Spanish-language surnames